This was the first edition of the tournament, Wesley Koolhof and Matwé Middelkoop won the title defeating Ken Skupski and Neal Skupski in the final 3–6, 6–4, [10–6].

Seeds

Draw

References
 Main draw

2015 ATP Challenger Tour